Arivaca poohella is a species of snout moth described by Jay C. Shaffer in 1968. It is found in the US from southern Arizona through New Mexico to Texas.

There is a white costal band on the forewing, extending halfway from the cell to the costa, it is bordered anteriorly with light orange. The hindwings are dark brown in males and light brown in females.

References

Moths described in 1968
Anerastiini
Moths of North America